Chrysallactis pulchra is a moth of the family Erebidae first described by Röber in 1925. It is found in Papua New Guinea.

References

Moths described in 1925
Nudariina